Justice for the Damned  are an Australian deathcore band formed in 2011. They release their debut album Dragged Through the Dirt in August 2017, followed by Pain Is Power in June 2020.

History
In July 2012, the band released the single "Copthrone King's".

In late 2016 the band stepped into the studio with Sam Basal to record their debut album, which was released in August 2017 under the title Dragged Through the Dirt. The album explored feelings of hopelessness and despair.

In 2019 the band relocated to New Jersey to record their second studio album with Will Putney. Pain Is Power was released on 12 June 2020.

Members
 Bobak Raffiee (Vocals)
 Nic Adams (Guitar)
 Kieran Molloy (Guitar)
 Ben Mirfin (Bass)
 Chas Levi (Drums)

Discography

Studio albums

Extended plays

Singles

References

Australian rock music groups
Musical groups established in 2011
2011 establishments in Australia